William Anton of Asseburg (born 1707 in Hinnenburg) was a German clergyman and bishop/prince for the Roman Catholic Archdiocese of Paderborn. He was ordained in 1763. He was appointed bishop in 1763. He died in 1782.

References 

1707 births
1782 deaths
German Roman Catholic bishops